Saul Andrew Blinkoff (born November 7, 1972) is an American film director, animator, and voice actor.

Personal life
His daughter, Meira, voiced one of the werewolf puppies in Hotel Transylvania. In Hotel Transylvania 2 and Hotel Transylvania 3: Summer Vacation, his son, Asher, voiced Dennis, Dracula's half-human, half-vampire grandson. Asher also voiced characters in The Jungle Book and Sing.

Filmography

As a Performer

As crew

References

External links

Living people
Place of birth missing (living people)
American film directors
1972 births
Walt Disney Animation Studios people